Zohib Islam Amiri (born 15 February 1990) is a professional footballer from Afghanistan who plays as a centre-back for A.S. Blainville and the Afghanistan national team.

Early life
Amiri was born on 15 February 1990 to an ethnic Hazara family in Kabul, Afghanistan. Growing up he played football often, using a homemade ball consisting of rolled up fabric stitched together. During the Taliban rule he often witnessed executions at the national stadium.

Club career

Early career
Amiri started his career with Shoa F.C. in 2005. In 2007, he went to play for Kabul Bank F.C.

Mumbai FC
Amiri joined Mumbai FC in 2011, and quickly became one of the star players at the club. Following his impressive performances during the 2012–13 I-League he received the award for the fan's players on the season. Despite reviving this prestigious award his contract with Mumbai FC was not renewed and Amiri began thinking of moving to Bahrain or Oman to play club football, but ultimately decided to stay in India.

Dempo SC
On 11 January, Amiri along with Tolgay Özbey signed for Indian club Dempo on a one-year contract, and received shirt number 18. He made his debut against Rangdajied United and scored. On 7 April he was involved in an ugly brawl in a match between Dempo SC and his former club Mumbai FC.

On 30 May both Amiri and Özbey signed extensions with Dempo.

On 4 April 2015, he scored two goals, including one only one minute from time to salvage a 2–2 draw with Sporting Goa.

DSK Shivajians
In January 2016, Amiri announced he signed a contract with Indian football club DSK Shivajians. He finished the season with DSK Shivajians last but did not relegate with his team because other clubs withdraw from the league.

Chennai City
In January 2017, Amiri joined Chennai City FC in the Indian I-League. He left after disagreement with the coach.

Blainville
In 2019, he briefly played with A.S. Blainville in the Canadian Première ligue de soccer du Québec, playing in cup matches, earning a red card in one.

Gokulam Kerala
On 2 November 2019, it was announced that Amiri joined Gokulam Kerala for 2019 i league.

Return to Blainville
Amiri also played with Blainville in the 2020 and 2021 seasons.

Real Kashmir

In 2021, ahead of the 2021–22 I-League season, Amiri joined Real Kashmir. He also appeared with the club in 2021 IFA Shield.

International career
Amiri made his debut in the 2005 SAFF Gold Cup against Maldives. He was part of the Afghanistan squad for the 2011 SAFF Championship, where they reached the final for the first time. Wearing number 3 he contributed many memorable performances, including scoring one of the goals in Afghanistan's biggest ever victory over Bhutan

Two years later Amiri served as captain for Afghanistan at the 2013 SAFF Championship, and was the rock of which the Afghan defense was built on. He scored goals in a 3–0 win over Bhutan and a 3–1 win over Sri Lanka. He played a crucial role as Afghanistan made it to the final for a second consecutive time an achieved a 2–0 victory against India.

In May 2014 Amiri captained the squad to the 2014 AFC Challenge Cup in the Maldives. On 22 May he scored the first goal of the game with a bullet header in Afghanistan's 3–1 victory over Turkmenistan at the 2014 AFC Challenge Cup. This was also Afghanistan's first every victory at the AFC Challenge Cup in eight attempts. After Afghanistan's 0–0 draw with Laos that confirmed their progression out of the group stage, an accident occurred while the Afghan players were being driven back to their hotel. Amiri suffered minor injuries, along with Faisal Sakhizada, Ahmad Hatifi, Balal Arezou, and Mustafa Azadzoy, the latter of which will have to take three weeks off to recover. All five players are set to miss the semi finals against Palestine. Former coach Mohammad Yousef Kargar and current coach Erich Rutemöller also suffered minor injuries.

Career statistics
Scores and results list Afghanistan's goal tally first, score column indicates score after each Amiri goal.

Honours

Afghanistan
SAFF Championship: 2013

Real Kashmir
IFA Shield: 2021

References

External links
Zohib Islam Amiri archives at Khel Now

Living people
1990 births
Hazara sportspeople
Afghan men's footballers
Footballers from Kabul
Association football central defenders
Afghanistan international footballers
Footballers at the 2014 Asian Games
Asian Games competitors for Afghanistan
I-League players
Indian Super League players
Première ligue de soccer du Québec players
Dhivehi Premier League players
Mumbai FC players
Dempo SC players
FC Goa players
DSK Shivajians FC players
Chennai City FC players
New Radiant S.C. players
A.S. Blainville players
Gokulam Kerala FC players
Afghan expatriate footballers
Afghan expatriate sportspeople in India
Expatriate footballers in India
Afghan expatriate sportspeople in Canada
Expatriate soccer players in Canada
Afghan expatriate sportspeople in the Maldives
Expatriate footballers in the Maldives